Morten Eskesen (born 24 January 1968) is a former Danish football player and now manager of the Denmark national under-18 football team.

He played at Køge Boldklub until he retired in 2004 and became manager of Kalundborg GB in the Danish 2nd Divisions in 2005. 

In July 2019, he became new manager of FC Helsingør. In January 2023 he left Helsingør to become new manager of the Denmark national under-18 football team.

References

External links
 
Danish Superliga Profile

1968 births
Living people
Danish men's footballers
Danish football managers
Køge Boldklub players
Danish Superliga players
Association football defenders
FC Helsingør managers
Karlslunde IF managers
Køge Nord FC managers
Danish 1st Division managers